The CTS is an upper stage developed by the China Academy of Launch Vehicle Technology (CALT) to improve the performance of the Long March 2C to high (>400 km of altitude) LEO missions like SSO. The two stage LM-2 delivers the payload and stage to an elliptical orbit with the desired apogee and the CTS points the stack in the direction of the correct vector and activates the solid rocket motor (SRM) main engine to circularize it. It then dispenses the spacecraft and does a passivisation procedure.

History 
It was initially developed as the SD stage for the initial deployment of the initial deployment of the Iridium constellation in 1997. In the 1999 LM-2C User Manual it was offered as the CTS option and flew to deploy the Double Star mission. Later it flew twice as part of the dual deployment system SMA, first for the deployment of the Huanjing 1A and 1B and in 2012 for the Shijian 9A and Shijian 9A technology demonstrator missions.

Design 
It is composed of the Spacecraft Adapter and Orbital Maneuver System (OMS). The Spacecraft Adapter is customized to the user's requirement, particularly in the separation environment and pointing accuracy. The OMS is composed by:
 Main structure
 Control system (avionics)
 Telemetry system
 Solid rocket motor (SRM)
 Reaction control system (RCS)

Versions 
The basic system has been offered in three different versions:
 SD: Initial version used exclusively for the Iridium fleet deployment.
 CTS: Improved commercial version offered in the 1999 User Manual with 3 axis stabilization.
 SMA: Government version which includes a dual payload adapter.

See also 
 Long March 2C
 CALT
 ETS
 Star 37
 Star 48
 Payload Assist Module

References 

Rocket stages
Solid-fuel rockets
Rocket engines of China